The 2010 FINA Diving World Cup was held in Changzhou, Jiangsu, People's Republic of China from June 2 to June 6, 2010. It was the 17th FINA Diving World Cup competition. 146 divers from 33 countries and regions competed in this World Cup. The 2010 FINA Diving World Cup is held one year after the 2009 FINA Diving World Championships which was held in Rome.

The "Team Event", which combines both male and female divers competing side by side, was included for the first time. This event was held on a trial basis.

Summary of results
United States won the inaugural "Team Event"
Australia's Matthew Mitcham won the Men's 10 metre platform competition
China won the remaining seven titles on offer at the 2010 Diving World Cup.

Participating Countries 
The number beside each nation represents the number of athletes who competed for each country at the 2010 FINA Diving World Cup.

 (8)
 (1)
 (2)
 (4)
 (8)
 (12)
 (1)
 (4)
 (4)
 (4)
 (8)
 (10)
 (3)
 (5)
 (2)
 (8)
 (10)
 (1)
 (13)
 (8)
 (1)
 (3)
 (2)
 (4)
 (12)

Medals Table

Schedule

Medal summary

Men

Women

Team Event

References

 
FINA Diving World Cup
Sport in Jiangsu
Fina Diving World Cup
Fina Diving World Cup
Diving competitions in China
International aquatics competitions hosted by China